Jaka Brodnik (born February 27, 1992 in Ljubljana, Slovenia) is a Slovenian professional basketball player for Keflavík of the Icelandic Úrvalsdeild karla. Standing at 2.03 m, he plays the small forward position.

Pro career
In 2009 he signed first pro contract with Zlatorog Laško. In Laško he stayed four season, before on July 4, 2013 signing a 3 year contract with ABA League and Eurocup team Union Olimpija.
On June 11, 2015 Olimpija and Brodnik broke contact.

On October 16, 2015 he signed 1+1 deal with Dzūkija Alytus. A month later he signed with the Swedish Norrköping Dolphins.

Brodnik signed with Þór Þorlákshöfn for the 2018–19 Úrvalsdeild karla season. In 17 regular season games he averaged 15.4 and 6.3 rebounds.

In May 2019, Brodnik signed with Úrvalsdeild karla club Tindastóll. During the 2019-20 season he averaged 15.3 points, 6.2 rebounds and 1.7 assists per game. Brodnik re-signed with the team on September 22, 2020. During the 2020-21 regular season, he averaged 14.4 and 6.0 rebounds per game while Tindastóll finished 8th in the league. During the playoffs, he averaged 18.0 and 6.7 rebounds in Tindastóll's first round loss against Keflavík.

In June 2021, Brodnik signed with Keflavík for the 2021–2022 season. He averaged 14.0 points and 5.5 rebounds for the season and signed a contract extension in May 2022.

References

External links
 Union Olimpija Profile
 Eurobasket.com profile
 Icelandic statistics at kki.is

1992 births
Living people
Keflavík men's basketball players
KK Olimpija players
Norrköping Dolphins players
Slovenian men's basketball players
Basketball players from Ljubljana
Ungmennafélagið Tindastóll men's basketball players
Úrvalsdeild karla (basketball) players
Þór Þorlákshöfn (basketball club) players
Small forwards
Helios Suns players